James Beim is an English polo player. He is the Captain of the England Polo Team.

Biography

Early life
He learned how to play polo at the North Cotswold Pony Club.

Career
He has won the Prince of Wales Cup, the Queen’s Cup aged 22, and the Cowdray Gold Cup. Moreover, in September 2012, he won the French Open at the Polo Club du Domaine de Chantilly in France. He is sponsored by Audi and Casablanca Polo.

In 2014, he was appointed as the Captain of the England Polo Team, replacing Luke Tomlinson.

References

Living people
English polo players
1980 births